Schnelldorf is a municipality  in the district of Ansbach in Mittelfranken in Bavaria in Germany.
It neighbours to Feuchtwangen, Wörnitz and Wettringen (Mittelfranken) in Bavaria and Rot am See, Wallhausen, Baden-Württemberg, Satteldorf and Kreßberg

References

External links
 

Ansbach (district)